The action of 11 November 1779 was a minor naval engagement between the British Royal Naval frigate  and the Spanish frigate Santa Margarita off Lisbon during the Anglo-Spanish War.

On 11 November, Captain Alexander Graeme in Tartar, belonging to the squadron under Commodore George Johnstone, was off Lisbon when he sighted the Spanish 38-gun frigate Santa Margarita. Tartar, with the wind behind her, caught up and engaged the Spanish vessel. After around two hours of fighting Santa Marguerita was almost dismasted when her captain decided to strike her colours.

Santa Margarita was added to the Royal Navy under her existing name as a 12-pounder 36-gun frigate. She had a very long career, serving until 1836.

Notes

References 

Conflicts in 1779
Naval battles involving Great Britain
Naval battles involving Spain
Naval battles of the Anglo-Spanish War (1779–1783)
Naval battles of the American Revolutionary War